The Sahitya Akademi Award is the second-highest literary honor in India. The Sahitya Akademi, India's National Academy of Letters, aims at "promoting Indian literature throughout the world". The Akademi annually confers on writers of "the most outstanding books of literary merit". The awards are given for works published in any of the 24 languages recognised by the akademi. Instituted in 1954, the award recognizes and promotes excellence in writing and acknowledge new trends. The annual process of selecting awardees runs for the preceding twelve months.

The inaugural edition of the award recognised works in twelve languages – Assamese, Bengali, Gujarati, Hindi, Kannada, Malayalam, Marathi, Odia, Punjabi, Tamil, Telugu and Urdu. In Tamil, the first recipient of the award was R. P. Sethu Pillai, who was honored for his collection of essays entitled Tamil Inbam in 1955. Posthumous recipients of the award include Kalki Krishnamurthy (1956), Bharathidasan (1969), Ku. Alagirisami (1970), Aadhavan Sundaram (1987), C. S. Chellappa (2001), Melaanmai Ponnuchamy (2008). , the award has been presented to 64 writers.

Rules and criteria for submissions
Although the Akademi is under the control of the Ministry of Culture, Government of India, it functions as an autonomous body. To be eligible for the award, the work must be an "outstanding contribution to the language and literature to which it belongs". It can be a "creative" or a "critical" work; translations, anthologies, abridgments, compilations, annotation, and research papers are ineligible. To contest in a particular year, the work must have been published during the last five years, prior to the preceding year. In case of tiebreakers, the literary contribution and "standing" of the authors would be taken into consideration. Only Indian nationals are eligible for the award. The award will be not be given if there are no more than two contestants in the final round. The works of authors who have been awarded earlier by the Akademi – translation prize, Bal Sahitya Puraskar and Yuva Puraskar are exceptions though – are ineligible. Further, the author must not be a recipient of the Bhasha Samman or the Sahitya Akademi Fellowship. The works of members of the executive board of the Akademi are ineligible for the award. Incomplete works may be considered for the award only if a part of the work, under which it competes, is deemed "complete". A posthumous publication is eligible only if the author has been deceased for over five years starting from the current year. The Akademi does not consider direct submissions from authors or publishers.

Selection process
The Akademi will prepare a "ground list", shortlisted from a set of eligible books in each of the recognized languages. Each language will have an "Advisory Board" member, who will shortlist and form and send a panel consisting of not more than five members to the President of the Akademi.

The preliminary panel consists of ten referees, who are nominated by the President upon requests received from the members of the "Advisory Board". The recommendations received from members of the  "Advisory Board" of each languages will be compiled and sent to the corresponding referees, who in turn will select two entries. A committee of three members, selected by the President, out of a panel of seven names recommended by the Language "Advisory Board", chooses the awardee in each language. The jury members are selected by the President after considering the recommendations in this behalf by the members of the Language Advisory Board concerned. The Akademi purchases the books recommended by the referees in the preliminary round and sends them to the jury members and the Convener. The jury members arrive at the winners, based on consensus or by majority. The jury also has the right to declare that no book is eligible for the award during a particular year b.

List of recipients

Notes

References

 
Tamil
Awards established in 1954